The 1998 Maui Invitational Tournament was an early-season college basketball tournament that was played, for the 15th time, from November 23 to November 25, 1998. The tournament, which began in 1984, was part of the 1998-99 NCAA Division I men's basketball season.  The tournament was played at the Lahaina Civic Center in Maui, Hawaii and was won by the Syracuse Orange. It was the second title for both the program and for its head coach Jim Boeheim.

Bracket 
* – Denotes overtime period

References

Maui Invitational Tournament
Maui Invitational